Andrei Vladlenovich Zelevinsky (30 January 1953 – 10 April 2013) was a Russian-American mathematician who made important contributions to algebra, combinatorics, and representation theory, among other areas.

Biography
Zelevinsky graduated in 1969 from the Moscow Mathematical School No. 2.
After winning a silver medal as a member of the USSR team at the International Mathematical Olympiad he was admitted without examination to the mathematics department of Moscow State University
where he obtained his PhD in 1978 under the mentorship of Joseph Bernstein,
Alexandre Kirillov and Israel Gelfand.

He worked in the mathematical laboratory of Vladimir Keilis-Borok at the Institute of Earth Science (1977–85), and at the Council for Cybernetics of the Soviet Academy of Sciences (1985–90). In the early 1980s, at a great personal risk, he taught at the Jewish People's University, an unofficial organization offering first-class mathematics education to talented students denied admission to Moscow State University's math department.

In 1990–91, Zelevinsky was a visiting professor at Cornell University, and from 1991 until his death was on faculty at Northeastern University, Boston.
With his wife, Galina, he had a son and a daughter; he also had several grandchildren.

Zelevinsky is a relative of the physicists Vladimir Zelevinsky and Tanya Zelevinsky.

Research
Zelevinsky's most notable achievement is the discovery (with Sergey Fomin) of cluster algebras.
His other contributions include:

 Bernstein–Zelevinsky classification of representations of p-adic groups;
 introduction (jointly with Israel Gelfand and Mikhail Kapranov) of A-systems of hypergeometric equations (also known as GKZ-systems) and development of the theory of hyperdeterminants;
 generalization of the Littlewood–Richardson rule and Robinson–Schensted correspondence using the combinatorics of "pictures";
 work (jointly with Arkady Berenstein and Sergey Fomin) on total positivity;
 work (with Sergey Fomin) on the Laurent phenomenon, including its applications to Somos sequences.

Awards and recognition
 Invited lecture at the International Congress of Mathematicians (Berlin, 1998)
 Humboldt Research Award (2004)
 Fellow (2012) of the American Mathematical Society
 University Distinguished Professorship (2013) at Northeastern University
 Steele Prize for Seminal Contribution to Research (2018)

References

External links
Home page of Andrei Zelevinsky (including CV)
Conference in memory of Andrei Zelevinsky
Publications of Andrei Zelevinsky (in Russian)
Publications of Andrei Zelevinsky (in English)
Research Focus: Andrei Zelevinsky's Cluster Algebras
Live journal run by Andrei Zelevinsky from 2007 to 2013

20th-century American mathematicians
21st-century American mathematicians
Russian mathematicians
Northeastern University faculty
Fellows of the American Mathematical Society
1953 births
2013 deaths
International Mathematical Olympiad participants
Soviet mathematicians
Combinatorialists